The Central School in Peoria, Arizona, at 10304 N. 83rd Ave., was built in 1906.  It is a two-room schoolhouse, built in Mission Revival architecture and/or Spanish Revival architecture.

It was listed on the National Register of Historic Places in 1982.

Its two classrooms are each  and are separated by an  central hall.

Museum and dissolution
It was occupied by the Peoria Arizona Historical Society Museum, also known as the Peoria Central School Museum, which was operated by the Peoria Arizona Historical Society.  The Society was dissolved in 2017, due to a dispute over control between two groups of members.

In July 2019 it was stated that the two groups had refused arbitration, and that the PAHS's lease with the city was terminated.

The city spent $19,000 securing artifacts of the PAHS and arranging for an inventory to be completed.

It was stated in February 2021 at the PAHS' Facebook page that the PAHS had been dissolved due to a court ruling, and all assets were turned over to the city, and the city called for original donors or loaners of artifacts to file claims to retrieve their items by May 2021.

See also
 National Register of Historic Places listings in Maricopa County, Arizona

References

National Register of Historic Places in Maricopa County, Arizona
Buildings and structures completed in 1906
Schools in Arizona
Defunct museums in Arizona
Two-room schoolhouses